The 2011–12 W-League season was the fourth season of the W-League, the Australian national women's football (soccer) competition. The season consisted of twelve rounds, giving each team a total of ten games, followed by a finals series.

Clubs

W-League teams for the 2011–12 season:

Regular season

League table

Regular season

Round 1

Round 2

Round 3

Round 4

Round 5

Round 6

Round 7

Round 8

Round 9

Round 10

Round 11

Round 12

Finals series

Semi-finals

Final

Regular season statistics

Leading goalscorers

Own goals

See also

 2011–12 Adelaide United W-League season
 2011–12 Brisbane Roar W-League season
 2011–12 Melbourne Victory W-League season

Notes

References

 
Aus
1
2011–12